Educational Foundation Baekdu Hagwon Keonguk (Korean: 오사카백두학원, Japanese: 白頭学院 建国 Hakutō Gakuin Kenkoku - Keonguk/Kenkoku means "country-building"; Japanese name means "Hakuto School"), is a South Korean international school located in Sumiyoshi-ku, Osaka. It serves kindergarten through high school. It is recognized by the government of Osaka Prefecture as an Article 1 private school under the School Education Act.

The Keonguk Industrial School and Keonguk Higher Girls' School  of the Baekdu Association were founded in March 1946.

See also
Japanese international schools in South Korea:
 Japanese School in Seoul
 Busan Japanese School

References

External links
 Educational Foundation Baekdu Hagwon
  Educational Foundation Baekdu Hagwon
  Educational Foundation Baekdu Hagwon

Elementary schools in Japan
Korean international schools in Japan
International schools in Osaka